King's Ransom may refer to:
The ransom sum paid to release a captured king, including:
 
 Ransom of King John II of France
King's Ransom (novel), a novel by Ed McBain
A King's Ransom, a novel by Jude Watson
A King's Ransom, a novel by Sharon Kay Penman about Richard I
King's Ransom (film), a 2005 comedy film
 Kings Ransom, the first film in ESPN's 30 for 30 documentary series
"King's Ransom", episode of Batman Beyond
The Kings Ransom band.